Stephen Herbert is a paralympic athlete from Great Britain competing mainly in category T37 sprint events.

Herbert competed in the 100m and 200m at the 2000 Summer Paralympics he also competed as part of the silver medal-winning British T38  relay team.

References

Paralympic athletes of Great Britain
Athletes (track and field) at the 2000 Summer Paralympics
Paralympic silver medalists for Great Britain
Living people
Medalists at the 2000 Summer Paralympics
Year of birth missing (living people)
Paralympic medalists in athletics (track and field)
British male sprinters